is Haruomi Hosono's third solo album. This album continues the tropical style of Hosono House and Tropical Dandy (which would continue later on with Paraiso) while showing influence from the music of New Orleans and also features performances from Tin Pan Alley and Happy End (excluding Takashi Matsumoto). The album's Japanese title was influenced by a Nagasaki convenience store of the same name that Hosono met while on Tin Pan Alley's "First & Last Concert Tour". This album was re-issued as part of a box set with the single version of the Tropical Dandy song "Peking Duck" (which was coupled with a song from this album) and an interview Hosono gave on a Tokyo Broadcasting System radio show.

Track listing

Personnel 
Haruomi Hosono - Bass, Vocals, Steelpan, Marimba, Shamisen, Vibraphone, Piano, Hammond organ, Production, Liner notes
Shigeru Suzuki - Guitar (Acoustic & Electric), Backing Vocals/Choir
Eiichi Ohtaki - Bass, Vocals, Backing Vocals/Choir
Tatsuo Hayashi - Drums, Percussion, Backing Vocals/Choir
Hiroki Komazawa - Pedal steel guitar
Hiroshi Satō - Piano, Clarinet
Motoya Hamaguchi - Percussion
Akiko Yano - Piano, Backing Vocals/Choir
Toru Okada - Percussion, Accordion
Hiroshi Okazaki - Alto saxophone
Ken Muraoka - Tenor saxophone
Riyōsō Sunahara - Bass saxophone
Tatsuro Yamashita - Ship Captain Voice, Backing Vocals/Choir
Kawada Ryūkyū Dance Troupe - Butterfly Voice, Backing Vocals/Choir
Tadashi Kosaka, Taeko Ōnuki, Makoto Kubota - Backing Vocals/Choir

1976 albums
Haruomi Hosono albums